Bancroft Creek is a stream in Freeborn County, in the U.S. state of Minnesota.

The creek was named for its location within Bancroft Township.

See also
List of rivers of Minnesota

References

Rivers of Freeborn County, Minnesota
Rivers of Minnesota